Piara Waters is a southeastern suburb of Perth, Western Australia within the City of Armadale.

Demographics
As a suburb that has been converted from small farms to residential lots, the population of Piara Waters has grown significantly from fewer than 100 in 2006 to over 14,000 as of 2021.

To accommodate this growth, new community and sporting facilities have spawned. Piara Waters Primary School was opened in February 2012 (catering for students from Kindergarten to Year 6), and Piara Waters Secondary College is currently in development and expected to open in 2023, initially for year 7 students and incrementing yearly until it reaches Year 12 in 2028.

In addition to the education facilities, a March 2022 press release stated that a $AU10.2 million shopping centre was approved for development.

For the older community, a new residential lifestyle resort is currently in early stages of development between Southampton Drive and Warton Road.

History
A large, central part of the suburb is taken up by the Piara Nature Reserve. This area was set on fire in March 2012 and threatened homes, but the fire was successfully contained by firefighters.

References

External links

Suburbs of Perth, Western Australia
Suburbs in the City of Armadale